Warla or Varla tehsil is a fourth-order administrative and revenue division, a subdivision of third-order administrative and revenue division of Barwani district of Madhya Pradesh.

Geography
Warla tehsil is bounded by Sendhwa tehsil in the northwest, north and northeast, Khargone district in the east and southeast, Maharashtra in the south, southwest and west.

See also 
Barwani district

Citations

External links

Tehsils of Madhya Pradesh
Barwani district